Deh Mozaffar (also Romanized as Deh Moz̧affar; also known as Moz̧affar) is a village in Tabadkan Rural District, in the Central District of Mashhad County, Razavi Khorasan Province, Iran. At the 2006 census, its population was 13, in 4 families.

References 

Populated places in Mashhad County